Lala Hsu is Taiwanese Mandopop artist Lala Hsu's self-titled debut studio album. It was released by AsiaMuse on 29 May 2009. Seven tracks were originally performed in the third season of CTV's One Million Star including additional four new tracks. The album is a bestseller both in Taiwan and Singapore upon its release.

Hsu won the "Best New Artist" award with this album at the 21st Golden Melody Awards.

Background 
In 2008, Hsu took part in the third season of One Million Star singing contest with aims to set up a chicken restaurant with the prize money.

In the second episode, Hsu performed her self-composed song titled "Waltz" and "Knowingly and Willfully" in the following episode. Throughout the competition, Hsu continued to sing her own compositions and in the sixth episode, her performance of her song "Riding a White Horse" scored 25 points, making her the fastest contestant to reach the full score since the launch of One Million Star. Hsu continued to perform her original songs including "Exit", "The Same Moonlight" and "White Flag" on the eight, tenth and twenty-seventh episode respectively.

On 15 August 2008 during the finals, she performed two more original self-composed songs, "Down in Sandbar" and "Perfume" which earned her an average score of 21.47 points, paving the way for her to become a professional singer.

Track listing

Awards and nominations

References

2009 debut albums
Lala Hsu albums